Peñaflor is a city and commune of the Talagante Province in central Chile's Santiago Metropolitan Region.

Geography

Demographics
Of these, 63,209 (94.9%) lived in urban areas and 3,410 (5.1%) in rural areas. The population grew by 32.8% (16,471 persons) between the 1992 and 2002 censuses.

Administration
As a commune, Peñaflor is a third-level administrative division of Chile administered by a municipal council, headed by an alcalde who is directly elected every four years. The 2012-2016 alcalde is Manuel Fuentes Rosales (UDI), and his council members are:
 Jorge Kellendonk Numhauser (UDI)
 Teresita Acevedo Lara (IND)
 Guillermo Donoso Aguilar (UDI)
 Jorge Navarrete Urzua (PS)
 Juan Plaza Núñez (IND)
 Juan Caroca Suarez (PDC)

Within the electoral divisions of Chile, Peñaflor is represented in the Chamber of Deputies by Denise Pascal (PS) and Gonzalo Uriarte (UDI) as part of the 31st electoral district, (together with Talagante, El Monte, Isla de Maipo, Melipilla, María Pinto, Curacaví, Alhué, San Pedro and Padre Hurtado). The commune is represented in the Senate by Guido Girardi Lavín (PPD) and Jovino Novoa Vásquez (UDI) as part of the 7th senatorial constituency (Santiago-West).

References

External links
 Official link - Municipality of Peñaflor

Communes of Chile
Populated places in Talagante Province